Clara Gibbings is a 1934 Australian film directed by F.W. Thring about the owner of a London pub who discovers she is the daughter of an earl. It was a vehicle for stage star Dorothy Brunton.

Synopsis

Clara Gibbings is the straight-talking owner of a London dockland public-house who discovers she is the legitimate (but abandoned) daughter of the Earl of Drumoor.  She launches herself in high society but soon becomes disillusioned with their morals.  In the process "she manages to get home some clever thrusts against the shams and hypocrisy of the life of elegance that she had thought so wonderful".  Clara falls in love with a young aristocrat, Errol Kerr, who proposes, and they go off to live in Australia.

Cast 
Dorothy Brunton as Clara Gibbings
Campbell Copelin as Errol Kerr
Harvey Adams as Justin Kerr
Noel Boyd as Yolande Probyn
Harold Meade as Earl of Drumoor
Byrl Walkley as Lady Drumoor
Marshall Crosby as Tudor
Russell Scott as Gallagher
Guy Hastings as Ted

Original Play

The script was one of a number of play adaptations from F.W. Thring. It was based on a 1929 English play which originally been presented by Thring in Melbourne (one of the cast, Beatrice Day, collapsed and died during rehearsal). It had also been produced on Broadway under the title of Lady Clara starring Florence Nash.

Production
The film was shot at Efftee's St Kilda studios in early 1934. Although Thring was credited as director, it is likely Frank Harvey did most of the actual direction on set.

During shooting, Thring announced he would close the studios after making the movie due to difficulties in getting his product released outside Melbourne. It finished by April. Thring did make another film before shutting down the studio, The Streets of London (1934), and announced plans to revive production, but died before he was able to.

"I took one look at myself in the 'rushes' – and looked away", admitted Brunton. "I simply could not bear to see myself any more. I thought I looked terrible."

Reception
The film was previewed in September and released in Melbourne at the Mayfair Cinema on 13 October where it was reported as "recording excellent business".<ref>"Clara Gibbings at Hit at Mel Mayfair", Everyone's,, 24 October 1934 p 30</ref> Reviewers commented on the fact it was basically a filmed play.

It won third prize (amounting to £750) in a competition held by the Commonwealth government in 1935. The judges said the film "contained sparkling dialogue supported by competent acting, although the adaptation of the English play on which it was based was inadequate." However, as of 1936 the film had not been seen on Sydney screens. It was released in England but received poor reviews.

Peter Fitzpatrick, biographer of Thring, later described the movie as looking "like a run-of-the-mill British B-picture, and that is at once a badge of proficiency and a mark of its remoteness from everything that Effree stood for."

 References 

Fitzpatrick, Peter The Two Frank Thrings, Monash University, 2012

External links

Clara Gibbings at Oz Movies
Review of play of same name (produced in conjunction with F. W. Thring), The Age'' newspaper via Google, 28 August 1933. C. Copelin played the same role in the play as in the movie, at the Garrick Theatre (Guildford), while Ruby May originated the title character. The co-playwrights are identified as "the authors of The Cat's Cradle", which featured Marie Tempest. Aimée Stuart is identified as killed WW1 airman William Bond's widow, in Bond's article.

1934 films
Australian black-and-white films
Films directed by F. W. Thring
Australian romantic drama films
1934 romantic drama films
1930s English-language films